OBI GmbH & Co. Deutschland KG is a German multinational home improvement supplies retailing company. It is headquartered in Wermelskirchen and operates 668 stores in Europe, of which 351 are in Germany.

History 
Obi was founded in 1970 by Emil Lux, Manfred Maus and Klaus Birker with the opening of the first Obi store in the Alstertal shopping center in Hamburg-Poppenbüttel.

In 1985 the Tengelmann Group acquired a majority stake in Obi. The share was increased in 2007 by buying the shares of the Lux founding family.

Obi has been present in Switzerland since 1999, in partnership with the Migros cooperative.

It formerly had operated 13 stores in mainland China but these were sold to B&Q in 2005.

The company expanded in Romania in 2008, where it opened 7 stores until 2010. Due to the economic crisis and the small market share, the company decided in 2014 to close the stores, 5 of them were sold to Jumbo.
Also in 2008 the company opened the first 2 stores in Ukraine, followed in 2009 by a third store. They closed in 2013.

In 2015, Obi took over 68 stores from bankrupt Baumax, 48 of which are located in Austria, 14 stores in Slovakia, two stores in Slovenia, and four locations in Czechia.

In March 2022, Obi closed all operations in Russia due to the Russia-Ukraine war.

On April 27, 2022, the chain's stores began to resume work in Russia. The retailer sold its business to a Russian investor. The businessman Josef Liokumovich became the new owner. According to him, he acquired the Russian business of OBI for a symbolic price of 600 rubles (10 USD).

On December 9, 2022, one of OBI's Russian stores burnt down due to a chemical explosion, resulting in at least one fatality.

Operations 

<br/ >

References

External links 
  Official German website

Hardware stores
Companies based in North Rhine-Westphalia
Retail companies established in 1970
Retail companies of Germany
1970 establishments in West Germany
German brands